The Asse is a small hill range in the district of Wolfenbüttel in southeastern Lower Saxony with a median height of 200 metres ASL; the highest elevation is the Remlinger Herse with a height of 234 m. There are more than 600 different plants found here; the Asse is mostly covered by trees. It has been inhabited since the 6th millennium BC by farmers coming from the Danube region.

For several hundred years, salt has been mined in Asse. One of these mines, Schacht Asse II, is now used to store low- and medium-grade radioactive waste produced by medicine and nuclear power plants.

Administration 
Administratively, the Asse is shared by the following villages:

 Mönchevahlberg
 Groß Vahlberg
 Klein Vahlberg
 Remlingen
 Wittmar
 Groß Denkte

The villages on the southern edge of the Asse belongs to Samtgemeinde Asse.

Hills and high points 
The hills and high points of the Asse include the following– sorted by height in metres (m) above sea level (NHN; unless otherwise stated):
 Remlinger Herse (234 m), east of Wittmar, northwest of Remlingen
 Festberg (232 m), northeast Wittmar, west of  Mönchevahlberg
 Asseburgberg (227.5 m), NNW of Wittmar
 Röhrberg (225 m), NNE of Wittmar
 Watzenberg (Watzeberg; 222.5 m), ENE of Wittmar
 Hinterer Eichberg (220 m), north of Groß Denkte
 Rothenberg (220 m), northeast of Wittmar
 Auf dem Klaare (216 m), north of Remlingen
 Mittlerer Eichberg (201 m), east of Groß Denkte
 Meescheberg (188 m), SSW of Klein Vahlberg
 Vorderer Eichberg (185 m), ENE of Groß Denkte

References

Wolfenbüttel (district)
Hill ranges of Lower Saxony
Nuclear technology in Germany